Tsonka Vaysilova (born 20 February 1967) is a Bulgarian basketball player. She competed in the women's tournament at the 1988 Summer Olympics.

References

1967 births
Living people
Bulgarian women's basketball players
Olympic basketball players of Bulgaria
Basketball players at the 1988 Summer Olympics
People from Panagyurishte